McGuinness Boulevard is a boulevard in Greenpoint, a neighborhood in the New York City borough of Brooklyn. It runs between Interstate 278 (Brooklyn-Queens Expressway) in the south and the Pulaski Bridge in the north, which connects to Queens and Jackson Avenue (NY 25A). South of Driggs Avenue, it is called McGuinness Boulevard South.

A major street going through Greenpoint, it was formerly known as Oakland Street, which went from Driggs Avenue to Newtown Creek. The road was widened considerably in 1954 after the Pulaski Bridge opened, replacing the Vernon Avenue Bridge to the west. In 1964, it was renamed after former local Democratic alderman Peter McGuinness.

The boulevard has a reputation as a dangerous speedway, with three pedestrians and one cyclist dying on the boulevard between 2008 and 2013.  Having one of the highest fatality rates in Brooklyn, it has been compared to Queens Boulevard, Queens's "Boulevard of Death".  According to one study, at the intersection with Nassau Avenue alone, drivers violated traffic laws almost four times per minute. As a result, the speed limit was lowered to 25 miles per hour from 30 mph in 2014 as part of Mayor Bill de Blasio's Vision Zero plan. Even so, locals are requesting speed cameras and left-turn traffic lights.

Other controversies have arisen on the street, including a planned homeless shelter at 400 McGuinness Boulevard, which was temporarily canceled due to neighborhood opposition. Its opening was delayed to September 2012.

References

Streets in Brooklyn
Greenpoint, Brooklyn